Vincent Vittoz (born 17 July 1975 in Annecy, Haute-Savoie) is a French former cross-country skier, non-commissioned officer and coach. He grew up in the town of La Clusaz in the Northern French Alps and has been competing since 1982. He made his FIS Cross-Country World Cup debut in January 1996 in Nové Město na Moravě, finishing 22nd in a 15 km classical race. He won a gold medal in the 15 km + 15 km double pursuit at the 2005 FIS Nordic World Ski Championships in Oberstdorf. As of 2018 Vittoz is the only French cross-country skiing world champion.

Vittoz's best overall team finish at the Winter Olympics was a fourth place in the 4 × 10 km relay events in Turin in the 2006 and in Vancouver in 2010. His best individual finish in Turin was sixth in the 15 km + 15 km double pursuit in. He finished fifth in the 15 km free event in Vancouver. He competed in four Olympic Games in total, in 1998, 2002, 2006 and 2010.

Vittoz won seven World Cup individual events and one World Cup team event. He was ranked second in the overall classification of the 2005 World Cup.

Vittoz served as an ambassador for Annecy's bid for the 2018 Winter Olympics.

He retired from competition at the end of the 2010-11 season, taking up a position as coach of the French national under-23 cross-country ski team in the spring of 2011. Seven years later, he was appointed as the coach of the French national biathlon team.

Cross-country skiing results
All results are sourced from the International Ski Federation (FIS).

Olympic Games

World Championships
 1 medal – (1 gold)

World Cup

Season standings

Individual podiums
8 victories – (7 , 1 ) 
26 podiums – (23 , 3 )

Team podiums
 1 victory – (1 ) 
 7 podiums – (7 )

References

External links

 

1975 births
Cross-country skiers at the 1998 Winter Olympics
Cross-country skiers at the 2002 Winter Olympics
Cross-country skiers at the 2006 Winter Olympics
Cross-country skiers at the 2010 Winter Olympics
French male cross-country skiers
Living people
Olympic cross-country skiers of France
Sportspeople from Annecy
FIS Nordic World Ski Championships medalists in cross-country skiing
French sports coaches
Cross-country skiing coaches